Idiosepsis is a genus of flies in the family Sepsidae.

Species
Idiosepsis spangleri Ozerov, 1990

References

Sepsidae
Diptera of Africa
Brachycera genera